Yuri Sergeevich Sakhnovsky (1866–1930) was a Russian composer, conductor and music critic.

Sakhnovsky came from a well-off family and was known as a "bon vivant (he weighed 260.lbs) handsome, brilliant and wealthy".

Sakhnovsky studied chant with Stepan Vasilevich Smolensky, to whom Sergei Rachmaninoff dedicated his Vespers, though Sakhnovsky later turned to a more "lush" style of choral writing. While a student Sakhnovsky took in his eight-year younger fellow student Rachmaninoff during the difficult winter when it seemed he was suffering from malaria.

In later life Sakhnovsky was active more as a critic than a composer. Particularly notorious were his attacks on Alexander Scriabin's music as "decadent" from 1911-1914.

His song "The Blacksmith" was recorded by Maxim Mikhailov and his song "The Clock" was recorded by Vladimir Rosing.

References and Sources

Strimple, Nick (2003). Choral Music in the Twentieth Century. Amadeus. .

1866 births
1930 deaths
Russian composers
Russian male composers
Russian conductors (music)
Russian male conductors (music)